Nolwazi Hlabangane (born 7 June 1995) is a South African rugby sevens player. She competed for South Africa at the 2022 Rugby World Cup Sevens in Cape Town.

References 

Living people
1995 births
Female rugby sevens players
South Africa international women's rugby sevens players